Richard J. Ablin is an American scientist, most notable for research on prostate cancer. According to the Wall Street Journal:

Early years
Ablin received a bachelor's degree from Lake Forest College in 1962 and a doctorate in microbiology from the University at Buffalo in 1967, where he received the distinguished alumni award in 2010.

Prostate cancer screening debate
Professor Ablin, who condemns the use of PSA for routine prostate cancer screening, was the subject of an interview published in New Scientist in February 2014. He said he hoped to expose how the urology community and drug industry misused the PSA test, putting money over the best interests of patients, adding: "I also want to show how the US Food and Drug Administration failed in its duty to the public: its advisers warned that routine PSA screening would cause a public health disaster, but it was approved under pressure from advocacy groups and drug companies."

Career
Ablin was an immunologist at Hektoen Institute for Medical Research and Cook County Hospital in Chicago, Illinois. While a member of the Biology and Genetics Program of Arizona Cancer Center, he published his 4th book, Metastasis of Prostate Cancer in 2007.

References

External links
University of Arizona profile

American medical researchers
Lake Forest College alumni
Prostate cancer
University at Buffalo alumni